The Union of Earth and Water  is a Baroque painting by Flemish artist Peter Paul Rubens, showing Cybele as the personification of earth holding the horn of plenty and Neptune as the personification of water in the center.
 The pair is crowned by the goddess Victoria and the union is heralded through a conch by the Triton below. The union symbolizes fertility, wealth and prosperity, specifically the city of Antwerp and the river Scheldt whose mouth in Rubens' times was blocked by the Dutch depriving Flanders of the access to the sea. The painting features a pyramidal composition, symmetry and the balance of forms. It was influenced by late Italian Renaissance, particularly by Venetian artists.

A smaller copy of the painting made in the Rubens' workshop was owned by the Russian businessman Vladimir Logvinenko. Following the abolition of a thirty per cent import duty on artworks in 2004, Logvinenko brought the copy from London to Moscow.

Provenance
The painting is housed in the Rubens Hall of the Hermitage Museum, in Saint Petersburg. Previously it had been in the Chigi Collection in Rome from which it was acquired by the Hermitage Museum between 1798 and 1800.

References

Mythological paintings by Peter Paul Rubens
17th-century allegorical paintings
Allegorical paintings by Flemish artists
Nude art
1610s paintings
Paintings in the collection of the Hermitage Museum
Paintings depicting Greek myths